The Ramsay Round, also known as the Charlie Ramsay Round, is a long distance hill running challenge near Fort William, Scotland. The route is a circuit of 58 miles (93 kilometres), taking in 24 summits with a total climb of around 28,500 feet (8,700 metres).  Ben Nevis, Great Britain's highest peak, is included in the route along with 22 other Munros.  Originally, all 24 summits on the Ramsay Round were Munros, but Sgurr an Iubhair was declassified as a Munro in 1997.  The route was devised by Charlie Ramsay as an extension to an existing 24-hour walking route, and first completed by Ramsay on 9 July 1978. 

Charlie's completion created Scotland's Classic Mountain Marathon.  The aim is for participants to complete the route, on foot, within 24 hours.  Runners must start and finish at the Glen Nevis Youth Hostel, and may run the route in either a clockwise or anticlockwise direction.  

Until June 2015, the  fastest time recorded was that of Adrian Belton from Baslow in Derbyshire. He recorded a time of 18 hours 23 mins.

On 12 June 2015, this record was broken by Jez Bragg with a new time of 18 hours 12 minutes. Soon after, on 5 July 2015, the record was lowered again, this time by Jon Ascroft in a time of 16 hours 59 minutes.

On Saturday 18 June 2016, Jasmin Paris set a new record for the Ramsay Round, knocking 46 minutes from the previous fastest round to set a new time of 16 hours 13 minutes. Previously the fastest ladies' time was that of Nicky Spinks who on 31 May 2014 recorded a time of 19 hours 39 minutes for a clockwise round, breaking the previous record set by Helene Diamantides.

Es Tresidder set a new fastest time on 6 July 2019, running the Round in 16 hours 12 minutes.

The record was reduced to 14 hours 42 minutes by Finlay Wild on 31 August 2020.

Route 
This is the original, anticlockwise route followed by Charlie Ramsay.

External links 
 Ramsay's Round - Official Site
 Nicky Spinks' personal site
  360 Virtual Tour of Ramsay's Round

References

Fell running challenges
Challenge walks
Mountains and hills of Scotland
Peak bagging in the United Kingdom
Sport in Scotland